Vasco Ilídio Alves Cordeiro (born 28 March 1973) is a Portuguese Socialist Party politician, who served as President of the Regional Government of the Azores from 2012, following his party's victory on the 2012 Azores regional election, until 2020.

Early life
He was born to middle-class farming family, the youngest of three sons of Luís and Lourdes Cordeiro.

He was in the Associação de Escoteiros de Portugal (Scouting Association of Portugal) and the local choir, who sung throughout the island. In addition to music, after school Cordeiro was active in theatre and literature: his mother was an author of dramas and comedies, and he and his friends would represent these roles throughout the island, such as Tradição and Sogra.

He continued his interest in music, even as he studied law in the Faculty of Law, at the University of Coimbra, where became part of the Grupo de Fados de Coimbra Alta Medina (Alta Medina Fado Group of Coimbra). He interpreted the Balada da Despedida during the annual Queima das Fitas (1990–1995).

Career
He returned to the Azores in 1995, and began to practice law, while at the same time beginning his role in the Juventude Socialista (Socialist Youth). He campaigned door-to-door in 1996, where he quickly built an empathy with the people.

With a post-graduate degree in Regional Law (achieved through a partnership between the University of the Azores and the Faculty of Law, at the University of Lisbon), Cordeiro served as legal counsel for the Associação de Jovens Agricultores Micaelenses (São Miguel Association of Agricultural Youth) between 1998 and 2001. He completed a dissertation on the A Dissolução dos Órgãos de Governo Próprio das Regiões Autónomas (The Dissolution of Government Bodies in the Autonomous Regions) (1998), before beginning an internship with the Portuguese Order of Lawyers, producing a dissertation on Breves Notas sobre a Deontologia Profissional do Advogado (Brief Notes on the Profession Ethics of Lawyers). He continued his legal practice between 1995 and 2003, supplementing it with teaching 11th Grade Philosophy at the Escola Secundária Antero de Quental (Antero de Quental Secondary School), in Ponta Delgada.

Meanwhile, he became the president of the JS-A (Juventude Socialista Açoriano) between 1997 and 1999, assuming in 1996 a place in the Regional Legislature of the Azores. He led the PS in the assembly from November 2000 until December 2003. At this date he abandoned his work as legal counsel and substituted Ricardo Rodrigues, who resigned following the Farfalha scandal, in the Secretary of Agriculture and Fishing. The following year, he exercised the functions of Regional Secretary for the Presidency, during the 9th Regional Government of the Azores, and responsible for the Economy portfolio during the fourth government of Carlos César.

In the 2012 regional election, he was elected with more votes and deputies then his predecessor in 1996, when the PS defeated the 20-year Social Democratic government of Mota Amaral.

Personal life
It was during his inter-island campaigning that he met Paula Cristina, a senior member of the cabin crew of SATA Air Açores, whom he later married in 2008. They have two children, Tomás, born in 2010 and António, born in 2013.

References

Socialist Party (Portugal) politicians
Living people
People from Ponta Delgada
University of Coimbra alumni
Presidents of the Government of the Azores
1973 births